Ramphastos is a genus of large neotropical Piciform birds within the family Ramphastidae commonly known as toucans. Toucans are members of the Ramphastidae family of neotropical birds, and only two of them, mountain toucans and typical toucans, have birds with the common name toucan. The other three genera are dichromatic toucanets, green toucanets, and araçaris. Toucans are well-loved all around the world for their friendly cheeks, wide eyes, and characteristic large and brilliantly colored bills. 

Below is a list of currently recognized species and subspecies.

See also 
 List of macaws
 List of Amazon parrots
 List of parrots

References 

Piciformes
Ramphastos
Ramphastos